Kamalvand-e Mohammad Hoseyn Parvaneh (also Romanized as Kamālvand Moḥammad Ḩoseyn Parvāneh) is a village in Dehpir Rural District, in the Central District of Khorramabad County, Lorestan Province, Iran. At the 2006 census, its population was 405, in 90 families.

References 

Towns and villages in Khorramabad County